The Canadian Screen Music Awards are a Canadian award, launched in 2022 by the Screen Composers Guild of Canada to honour achievements in musical composition for film, television and digital media.

Nominees for the inaugural awards were announced on August 16, 2022, with the awards presented on September 21.

Awards

See also
 List of music awards
 Music of Canada

References

External links

Canadian film awards
Canadian television awards
Canadian music awards
Film music awards
Awards established in 2022
2022 establishments in Canada